Mythical Magic is a solo album by pianist Joanne Brackeen recorded in 1978 and released on the German MPS label.

Reception 

AllMusic reviewer Michael G. Nastos stated "Solo piano. All originals; perky and pungent".

Track listing
All compositions by Joanne Brackeen.

 "Foreign Ray" – 3:46
 "Mythical Magic" – 7:46
 "Hobbits" – 4:13
 "Told You So" – 4:02
 "Phantom's Forum" – 4:30
 "Transition" – 4:00
 "Of Gnomes in Dance" – 5:36
 "Now or Never" – 4:39
 "Minuend" – 3:07

Personnel
Joanne Brackeen – piano

References

Joanne Brackeen albums
1979 albums
MPS Records albums
Solo piano jazz albums